Bruno Belin (16 January 1929 – 20 October 1962) was a Croatia-born Yugoslav footballer who was part of Yugoslav national team at the 1954 FIFA World Cup.

Club career
He started his career at Zagreb based NK Metalac and after completing his military service in 1950 he joined Belgrade-based giants FK Partizan where he won one national championship and 3 cup titles. Belin played a total of 463 games for Partizan with 41 goals scored. He was considered one of the best Yugoslav defenders at the time he played, and he especially stood out for his technique, quickness and calmness in the game.

International career
He made his debut for Yugoslavia in a December 1952 friendly match against West Germany and earned a total of 25 caps scoring no goals. His final international was a May 1959 European Nations' Cup qualifying match against Bulgaria.

Death and legacy
After retiring from playing career, he became a coach, however he died in a car crash in 1962 at the 25th kilometer of Belgrade-Zagreb highway, together with Partizan defender Čedomir Lazarević, water polo player Boris Škanata and Radnički Beograd player Vladimir Josipović.

The FK Partizan Academy, commonly known as "Belin–Lazarević–Nadoveza youth school" is named in his honour.

Honours
Partizan
Yugoslav First League: 1960–61
Yugoslav Cup: 1952, 1954, 1957

References

External links
 

1929 births
1962 deaths
Footballers from Zagreb
Association football defenders
Yugoslav footballers
Yugoslavia international footballers
1954 FIFA World Cup players
FK Partizan players
Yugoslav First League players
Road incident deaths in Yugoslavia
Road incident deaths in Serbia
Burials at Belgrade New Cemetery